Bartolommeo Petrini (1642–1664) was an Italian painter of the late-Baroque period.

He was born in Perugia, and pupil of Luigi Scaramuccia. He traveled to Milan with Scaramuccia.

References

1642 births
1664 deaths
17th-century Italian painters
Italian male painters
Italian Baroque painters
Umbrian painters